Michele Florindo (born 2 May 1980 in Rovigo, Italy) is an Italian football manager and former player, currently in charge as head coach of Calvina.

Coaching career
On 7 October 2019, he was hired by Serie D club Calvina.

References

External links

1980 births
People from Rovigo
Italian footballers
Living people
Association football defenders
Calcio Padova players
Spezia Calcio players
A.S.D. Victor San Marino players
Serie C players
Serie D players
Italian football managers
Sportspeople from the Province of Rovigo
Footballers from Veneto